Johann Heinrich von Ostein (1579–1646) was the Prince-Bishop of Basel from 1628 to 1646.

References

Prince-Bishops of Basel
1646 deaths
1579 births